A security agency is a governmental organization that conducts intelligence activities for the internal security of a nation. They are the domestic cousins of foreign intelligence agencies, and typically conduct counterintelligence to thwart other countries' foreign intelligence efforts.

For example, the United States Federal Bureau of Investigation (FBI) is the internal intelligence, security and law enforcement agency, while the Central Intelligence Agency (CIA) is an external intelligence service, which deals primarily with intelligence collection overseas. A similar relationship exists in Britain between MI5 and MI6.

The distinction, or overlap, between security agencies, national police, and gendarmerie organizations varies by country. For example, in the United States, one organization, the FBI, is a national police, an internal security agency, and a counterintelligence agency. In other countries, separate agencies exist, although the nature of their work causes them to interact. For example, in France, the Police nationale and the Gendarmerie nationale both handle policing duties, and the Direction centrale du renseignement intérieur handles counterintelligence.

Likewise, the distinction, or overlap, between military and civilian security agencies varies between countries. In the United States, the FBI and CIA are civilian agencies, although they have various paramilitary traits and have professional relationships with the U.S.'s military intelligence organizations. In many countries all intelligence efforts answer to the military, whether by official design or at least on a de facto basis. Countries where various military and civilian agencies divide responsibilities tend to reorganize their efforts over the decades to force the various agencies to cooperate more effectively, integrating (or at least coordinating) their efforts with some unified directorate. For example, after many years of turf wars, the member agencies of the United States Intelligence Community are now coordinated by the Director of National Intelligence, with the hope to reduce stovepiping of information.

In Ireland, for example, intelligence operations relevant to internal security are conducted by the military (G2) and police (SDU), rather than civilian agencies.

Security agencies frequently have "security", "intelligence" or "service" in their names. Private organizations that provide services similar to a security agency might be called a "security company" or "security service", but those terms can also be used for organizations that have nothing to do with intelligence gathering.

Security agency vs. secret police

There is debate about whether some security agencies should be characterized as secret police forces. The extent to which security agencies use domestic covert operations to exert political control varies by country and political system. Such operations can include surveillance, infiltration, and disruption of dissident groups, attempts to publicly discredit dissident figures, and even assassination or extrajudicial detention and execution. Security agencies are constrained in some countries by a mesh of judicial and legislative accountability, whereas in others they may answer only to a single leader or executive committee.

Security agencies

 Armenia: National Security Service
 Australia: Australian Security Intelligence Organisation
 Bahrain: National Security Agency 
Bangladesh: National Security Intelligence (NSI)
 Belarus: State Security Agency of the Republic of Belarus (KDB or KGB) 
 Bosnia and Herzegovina: Intelligence-Security Agency of Bosnia and Herzegovina
 Brazil Federal Police
 Brunei: Internal Security Department (Brunei)
 Canada: Canadian Security Intelligence Service, successor of RCMP Security Service
 China: Ministry of State Security (China)
 Croatia: Military Security and Intelligence Agency (Croatian: Vojna sigurnosno-obavještajna agencija or VSOA or VSA) and Security and Intelligence Agency (Croatian: Sigurnosno-obavještajna agencija ili SOA)
 East Germany (former): Stasi
 Estonia: Estonian Internal Security Service (KAPO)
 European Union: European Union Agency for Network and Information Security (ENISA, originally European Network and Information Security Agency)
 Finland: Finnish Security Intelligence Service (SUPO)
 France: functions divided between Police nationale, Gendarmerie nationale, and Direction centrale du renseignement intérieur
 Germany: Federal Office for the Protection of the Constitution (Germany), Bundeskriminalamt
 India:  
 Intelligence Bureau (India)
 National Investigation Agency
 Indonesia: Indonesian State Intelligence Agency
 Ireland:
 Directorate of Military Intelligence (Ireland)
 Special Detective Unit, formerly the Special Branch and before that the Criminal Investigation Department (CID)
 Israel: Shin Bet (Israel Security Agency (ISA)) and others: see Israeli Intelligence Community
 Japan: Public Security Intelligence Agency (PSIA)
 Malaysia: Royal Malaysian Police Special Branch
 Netherlands: General Intelligence and Security Service
 New Zealand: New Zealand Security Intelligence Service
 Nigeria: State Security Service (SSS) 
 Norway: Norwegian Police Security Service
 Oman: Internal Security Service
 Pakistan: 
 Inter-Services Intelligence - ISI
 Intelligence Bureau (Pakistan)
 Federal Investigation Agency
 Poland: Agencja Bezpieczeństwa Wewnętrznego
 Portugal: 
Sistema de Informações da República Portuguesa (SIRP)
former: PIDE, or Polícia Internacional e de Defesa do Estado 
 Russia: 
 Federal Security Service of the Russian Federation (FSB), successor of Federal Counterintelligence Service (FSK), successor of KGB
 Main Directorate of Special Programs of the President of the Russian Federation
 Main Intelligence Directorate (Russia)
 Serbia: Military Security Agency (BIA) (Serbian: Безбедносно-информативна агенција, БИА / Bezbednosno-informativna agencija, BIA)
 Singapore: Internal Security Department (Singapore)
 Slovenia: Slovenian Intelligence and Security Agency
 Somalia: National Intelligence and Security Agency (NISA) (Somali: Hay'ada Sirdoonka iyo Nabadsugida)
 Soviet Union (former): 
 Cheka
 State Political Directorate (GPU)
 People's Commissariat for Internal Affairs (NKVD) which became Ministry for Internal Affairs (MVD)
 People's Commissariat for State Security (NKGB) which became Ministry for State Security (MGB)
 SMERSH
 KGB, Komitet gosudarstvennoy bezopasnosti (Russian: Комите́т госуда́рственной безопа́сности (КГБ)
 South Africa: State Security Agency (South Africa)
 Spain (all the following agencies have security and security intelligence functions):
 Centro Nacional de Inteligencia (CNI)
 General Commissariat of Information (CGI)
 General Commissariat of Judiciary Police (CGPJ)
 Civil Guard Information Service (SIGC)
 Sri Lanka: State Intelligence Service (Sri Lanka) (SIS)
 Sweden: Swedish Security Service (Säkerhetspolisen)
 Switzerland: Intelligence Service of the Federation (Nachrichtendienst des Bundes)
 Turkey: The National Intelligence Organization (Millî İstihbarat Teşkilâtı, MIT)
 Ukraine: Security Service of Ukraine
 United Kingdom (all the following agencies have security and security intelligence functions): 
 MI5 (also known as the Security Service)
 MI6 (also known as the Secret intelligence Service)
 Government Communications Headquarters (GCHQ)
 Defence Intelligence Staff (DIS)
 United States (all the following agencies have security and security intelligence functions):
Central Security Service
Federal Bureau of Investigation
National Security Agency
Defense Intelligence Agency

See also
 List of intelligence agencies
 Secret police
 Secret service
 Security Service (disambiguation)
 International security

References

 
Law enforcement
Security